Douglas Richard Brennan (January 10, 1903 – November 8, 1972) was a Canadian professional hockey defenceman for the New York Rangers of the National Hockey League between 1931 and 1934. The rest of his career, which lasted from 1925 to 1936, was spent in the minor leagues. He won the Stanley Cup with the Rangers in 1933. He was born in Peterborough, Ontario.

Playing career
Before getting to the NHL Brennan played for including the Winnipeg Maroons of the AHA, the Kenora Thistles of the NOHA, and the Vancouver Lions of the PCHL. He was acquired by the New York Rangers when they bought his professional rights from Vancouver on October 30, 1931. He would play for the team until he was released following the 1934 season. He won the Stanley Cup with New York in 1933. Following his time in New York he played 2 seasons in the CAHL his first year was spent with the Philadelphia Arrows and in his second year he played for the Springfield Indians. He retired from hockey after his one season in Springfield in 1936.

He died at Campbellford Memorial Hospital in 1972.

Career statistics

Regular season and playoffs

References

External links
 

1903 births
1972 deaths
Canadian ice hockey defencemen
Ice hockey people from Ontario
New York Rangers players
Ontario Hockey Association Senior A League (1890–1979) players
Philadelphia Arrows players
Sportspeople from Peterborough, Ontario
Springfield Indians players
Stanley Cup champions
Vancouver Lions players
Windsor Bulldogs (1929–1936) players
Winnipeg Maroons players